Errol Stewart (born 1931) is a former Australian international lawn bowler.

He won a silver medal in the fours with Errol Bungey, Robert King and Keith Poole at the 1974 British Commonwealth Games in Christchurch.

References

1931 births
Living people
Australian male bowls players
Commonwealth Games medallists in lawn bowls
Commonwealth Games silver medallists for Australia
Bowls players at the 1974 British Commonwealth Games
20th-century Australian people
Medallists at the 1974 British Commonwealth Games